Charalampos 'Babis' Lykogiannis (born 22 October 1993), also known as Lykos  (Greek for "wolf" – from the first letters of his name), is a Greek professional footballer who plays as a left-back for Serie A club Bologna and the Greece national team.

Club career

Olympiacos
Lykogiannis is a product of the youth system of Olympiacos and very soon became a vital part of Olympiacos' football academy. He is considered as one of the most gifted players of his generation.

On 25 January 2012, he made his debut with the first team in a Greek Football Cup match against Panionios as a substitute in the 82nd minute in front of 15,000 fans.

On 25 October 2012, Lykogiannis made his European debut in an away UEFA Champions League game against Montpellier HSC as a substitute in the 88th minute.  He was brought on to play as a defensive midfielder for the remaining minutes of the match. Four days after his debut in UEFA Champions League, on 29 October 2012, Lykogiannis made his first appearance in an away game for Superleague Greece against Aris as a substitute in the 68th minute.

He signed a professional contract with Olympiacos in June 2011, which in August 2012 he renewed until summer 2015.

In August 2013, he joined Levadiakos on loan. A year later, in August 2014 he joined Ergotelis on loan.

Sturm Graz
On 16 July 2015, Lykogiannis joined Sturm Graz for an undisclosed fee, having signed a contract for two years plus the option of a further year, while Olympiacos kept a 30% future resale rate. On 6 August 2015, he made his debut with the club as a substitute in an away 1–1 draw against Rubin Kazan for the 2nd leg of the 3rd qualifying UEFA Europa League round. On 27 October 2015, he made his debut in the Austrian Cup playing in a 3–2 win against ASK Ebreichsdorf.

On 22 November 2015, he scored his first goal with the club in a 3–1 away loss against Red Bull Salzburg for Austrian Bundesliga. On 27 November 2016, he opened the score with a free kick, in a 2–1 away win against rivals Rapid Wien. On 4 December 2016, he scored his second goal with another free kick in a 4–0 away win against Wolfsberger AC. On 12 March 2017, Lykogiannis scored with a long distance kick after an assist from Barış Atik giving a lead of two goals in his club in a final 2–1 home win against Rapid Wien. On 29 May 2017, Lykogiannis received a great distinction as he included in the team of the season for the 2016–17 season. Lykogiannis scored three goals and an equal number of assists in 36 games in all competitions.

On 6 August 2017, he scored his first goal for the 2017–18 season in a 3–2 away win against SV Mattersburg. On 25 November 2017, he scored the only goal with a wonderful kick after a corner from his teammate Peter Žulj, in the extra time of the game sealing a 1–0 home win against LASK Linz. In December 2017, it was reported that Lykogiannis’ performances had attracted interest from Greek clubs as well as foreign clubs like English Championship side Leeds United. Eventually, he left the club having 81 appearances (6 goals, 5 assists) in all competitions.

On 28 December 2019, Sturm Graz revealed their Team of the Decade, with Tasos Avlonitis and Lykogiannis both included in the starting 11.

Cagliari
On 17 January 2018, the Sardinian club managed to signed the Greek international, on a four-and-a-half years' contract, for a transfer fee of €600,000. His contract, which ran until 2022, was worth €1.4 million per year. On 25 October 2020, he scored with a free kick in a 4–2 home win game against F.C. Crotone. It was his first goal with the club in all competitions.
During the 2020–21 season, Cagliari was in danger of being relegated this year. On 25 April 2021, Lykogiannis opened the score in a thrilling 3–2 win against A.S. Roma and two weeks later scored a fantastic goal in the 1st minute of the match in a crucial game against Benevento, where Cagliari prevailed 3–1. It was his best season so far, and his effectiveness can be seen from the statistics as he had 4 goals and 2 assists during 2020–21 season. The most important thing, however, is that the four times he sent the ball into the net, he scored his team's first goal in three wins and one draw.

Bologna
On 1 July 2022, Lykogiannis moved to Bologna.

International career

Greece under-17
He was called for duty for Greece under-17 to participate in the 2007 UEFA European Under-17 Football Championship qualifying round against Norway.

Greece under-19
Lykogiannis make his debut with Greece under-19 in an international friendly game against Sweden under-19.

2012 UEFA European Under-19 Football Championship
Lykogiannis scored his first and winning goal in the 108th minute (1–2 after extra time) for Greece U19 in the semifinals against England U19 for the 2012 UEFA European Under-19 Football Championship finals that took place in Estonia. He came on as a substitute at the 67th minute for Greece U19 in the final against Spain U19, but the Spanish U19 side won the tournament with 1–0.

Greece under-21
On 15 August 2012, he made his debut with Greece U21 for an international friendly game at Dimotiko stadio Kozanis against Poland U21.

Greece
On 24 May 2017, Lykogiannis received his debut Greece national football team call from Michael Skibbe for the match against Bosnia national football team at the preliminary round of the 2018 World Cup. On 3 September 2017, he made his debut as a substitute in a 1–2 home loss for 2018 FIFA World Cup qualification against Belgium.

Honours

Club
Olympiacos
Super League: 2012–13
Greek Cup: 2011–12, 2012–13
SK Strum Graz
Austrian Cup: 2017–18

InternationalGreece U19'''
UEFA European Under-19 Championship runner-up:2012

Individual
UEFA European Under-19 Championship Team of the Tournament: 2012
Austrian Bundesliga Team of the Year: 2016–17

References

External links
 

1993 births
Living people
Greek footballers
Association football defenders
Greece youth international footballers
Greece under-21 international footballers
Greece international footballers
Olympiacos F.C. players
Levadiakos F.C. players
Ergotelis F.C. players
SK Sturm Graz players
Cagliari Calcio players
Bologna F.C. 1909 players
Super League Greece players
Austrian Football Bundesliga players
Serie A players
Greek expatriate footballers
Expatriate footballers in Austria
Expatriate footballers in Italy
Greek expatriate sportspeople in Austria
Greek expatriate sportspeople in Italy
Footballers from Piraeus